The 2002 Ukrainian Figure Skating Championships were the national championships of 2001–2002 figure skating season. Skaters competed in the disciplines of men's singles, ladies' singles, pair skating, and ice dancing on the senior level. The results were used to choose the teams to the 2002 Winter Olympics, the 2002 World Championships, and the 2002 European Championships.

Results

Men

Ladies

Pairs

Ice dancing

External links
 results

Ukrainian Figure Skating Championships
2001 in figure skating
Ukrainian Figure Skating Championships, 2002
2001 in Ukrainian sport
2002 in Ukrainian sport